John Anderson Palmer is an American philosopher and professor of philosophy at the University of Florida. 
He is known for his expertise on ancient Greek philosophy.  In 2014, he was awarded a Guggenheim Fellowship.

Books
Plato’s Reception of Parmenides (Oxford, 1999) 
Parmenides and Presocratic Philosophy (Oxford, 2009)

References

External links
 John Palmer at University of Florida

21st-century American philosophers
Philosophy academics
Princeton University alumni
University of Florida faculty
American scholars of ancient Greek philosophy
1965 births
Scholars of ancient Greek philosophy
Living people